Mohammad Hotak (Pashto/Dari/Arabic/Urdu: ډاکټر محمد هوتک ) is a founder of the British Afghanistan Chamber of Commerce and Industry and is also a managing partner in Washington and Afghanistan based MAIH Group, a consulting and contracting firm that helps international companies do business in Afghanistan and helps Afghan companies grow globally. He is also a board member for Foreign Language Institute, CSA Business, and AWRCC. He a member of the Afghana Foundation and Afghan Council of Great Britain.

Hotak has commentated on global affairs, business, philanthropy and social issues on BBC, RT, Al Jazeera, Islam Channel, Tolo TV and Ariana TV. His article From Aid To Trade was published by Foreign Policy Magazine.

Publications and Interviews
From aid to trade. Published by Foreign Policy 
The Islamic world's last hope against terror: A nonviolent Mujahid. Published by Central & South Asia Business Magazine 
BBC 
Islam Channel 
RT UK

References

Afghan emigrants to England
1983 births
Living people